Coleophora polynella is a moth of the family Coleophoridae. It is found in Turkestan and Uzbekistan.

The larvae feed on Artemisia turanica. They create a silky case, which is broader anteriorly and gradually attenuating toward the caudal end. The surface is slightly uneven and densely covered with hairs of the plant. There are barely discernible longitudinal stripes. The valve is three-sided and the length of the case is 4-4.5 mm. It is grayish-white in color. Larvae of the first generation can be found in May. There is also a second generation, which feeds on the fruits of the host plant.

References

polynella
Moths of Asia
Moths described in 1972